The Great Eastern is the third studio album by Scottish indie rock band The Delgados. It was released on 17 April 2000 in the United Kingdom on their own Chemikal Underground record label, and later on 9 May 2000 in the United States.

The Great Eastern was their first album not to be named after a cycling theme – the title refers to a textile mill in Glasgow, latterly a hostel for the homeless.

Reception 

At the end of 2000, The Great Eastern was included in several publications' lists of the year's best albums, including being named fifth best by Mojo and 28th best by NME. The album was nominated for the 2000 Mercury Prize.

In 2008, The Great Eastern was ranked at number 49 on Mojos list of "The 50 Greatest UK Indie Records of All Time".

Track listing

Personnel 
Credits for The Great Eastern adapted from album liner notes.

The Delgados
 Stewart Henderson – bass guitar, accordion, autoharp, guitar, handclaps, piano, Rhodes piano, sleigh bells, vocals
 Emma Pollock – guitar, vocals, handclaps, vibraphone
 Paul Savage – drums, dulcimer, guitar, Hammond organ, handclaps, keyboards, Korg synthesizer, piano, Rhodes piano, sampler, tubular bells
 Alun Woodward – guitar, vocals, bowed guitar, dulcimer, e-bow, keyboards, slide guitar, vibraphone
 The Delgados – writing, brass arrangement, string arrangement, woodwind arrangement

Additional musicians
 Alan Barr – cello, string arrangement
 Barry Burns –  Hammond organ, Korg synthesizer, piano, Rhodes piano
 Lorne Cowieson – trumpet, flugelhorn, brass arrangement
 Charlie Cross – viola, violin, string arrangement
 Graham Flett – double bass
 Dave Fridmann – cello sampling, weights
 David Laing – violin
 Greg Lawson – violin, string arrangement
 Camille Mason – clarinet, flute, piano, woodwind arrangement
 Guy Milford – tenor horn
 Jim Putnam – additional vocals
 Paul Stone – euphonium, trombone
 Graeme Wilson – saxophone

Production
 The Delgados – production, recording
 Tony Doogan – recording
 Dave Fridmann – mixing, production
 James Jarvie – "black magic"
 Chris Renwick – programming
 Dougie Summers – programming

Artwork and design
 Tony Doogan – camcorder
 Adam Piggot – artwork, photography
 Lindsay Savage – cover photography

Charts

References

The Delgados albums
2000 albums
Chemikal Underground albums
Albums produced by Dave Fridmann
Albums recorded at Tarbox Road Studios